Sybilla of Burgundy (1060–1103), was a French noble, Duchess consort of Burgundy by marriage to Eudes I, Duke of Burgundy.

She was a daughter of William I, Count of Burgundy and Stephanie. She was married to Eudes I, Duke of Burgundy in 1080.
 
Children: 
Florine of Burgundy
Helie of Burgundy 
Hugh II, Duke of Burgundy
Henry (died 1131)

References

1060 births
1103 deaths
Sibylla
Duchesses of Burgundy
12th-century French people
French people of German descent
Sibylla
12th-century French women